Kuzmino is a rural locality (a village) in Posyolok Mezinovsky, Gus-Khrustalny District, Vladimir Oblast, Russia. The population was 52 as of 2010.

Geography 
Kuzmino is located 32 km southwest of Gus-Khrustalny (the district's administrative centre) by road. Ilyichyovo is the nearest rural locality.

References 

Rural localities in Gus-Khrustalny District